Kentuck (also New Kentucky) is an unincorporated community in southeastern Jackson County, West Virginia, United States.  It lies along Kentuck Road southeast of the city of Ripley, the county seat of Jackson County.  Its elevation is 922 feet (281 m).

The community was named after the state of Kentucky.

References

Kentucky is bordered with 8 other states and is the 37 largest state of all 50

Unincorporated communities in Jackson County, West Virginia
Unincorporated communities in West Virginia